Kristaq Mitro (born 1 December 1948, in Vlorë) is an Albanian film director. He is currently professor in Arts University of Tirana. He directed Apasionata in 1983 with Ibrahim Muçaj.

Filmography
 Një djalë edhe një vajzë (1990)
 Telefoni i një mëngjesi (1987)
 Duaje emrin tënd (1984)
 Apasionata (1983)
 Njeriu i mirë (1982)
 Në prag të lirisë (1981)
 Liri a vdekje (1979)
 Nusja dhe shtetërrethimi (1978)
 Dimri i fundit (1976)
 Tokë e përgjakur (1976)
 Kur zbardhi një ditë (1971)

References

External links

Albanian film directors
1945 births
Living people
People from Vlorë